Three Many Weddings is a 2013 Spanish romantic comedy directed by Javier Ruiz Caldera and starring Inma Cuesta and Martiño Rivas. It was nominated for seven Goya Awards and won the Best Comedy award at the 1st Feroz Awards.

Plot
Ruth is a marine biologist who, in less than a month, is invited to the weddings of three of her ex-boyfriends. Single and unable to refuse, she manages to convince her new intern, Dani, to go with her. During the weddings, plenty of outlandish events take place and eventually lead Ruth to decide who she wants to be with in the future.

Cast

Production 
Eneko Lizarraga Arratibel, Francisco Sánchez Ortiz, Enrique López Lavigne, Mercedes Gamero, and Mikel Lejarza took over production duties.

Release 
The film screened in the Venice Days independent section of the 70th Venice International Film Festival. It also screened as the opening film of the 10th Seville European Film Festival on 8 November 2013.

Awards and nominations

Remake
On October 12, 2015 a Dutch remake was released called  (Yes, I do!). It starred Elise Schaap and Martijn Lakemeier.

See also 
 List of Spanish films of 2013

References

External links

2013 romantic comedy films
2013 films
Spanish romantic comedy films
Films about weddings
2010s Spanish films
2010s Spanish-language films